James Monroe Jones (1862-1928) was Mayor of Kansas City, Missouri from 1896 to 1900.

Biography
Jones was born in Prospect, New York and moved to Kansas City in 1885.  He was a lawyer with offices at 15 West 9th Street and residence at 721 Harrison Street.  Prior to being mayor he was circuit court judge and had a residence at Independence and Park.

References

1862 births
1928 deaths
Mayors of Kansas City, Missouri
People from Trenton, New York